Robert W. (Bob) Carver is an American designer of audio equipment based in the Pacific Northwest.

Educated as a physicist and engineer, he found an interest in audio equipment at a young age.  He applied his talent to produce numerous innovative high fidelity designs since the 1970s. He is known for designing the Phase Linear 700, at 350 W per channel the most powerful consumer audio amplifier available in 1972. He went on to found the Carver Corporation in 1979, Sunfire in 1994, and the Bob Carver LLC in 2011  which was sold to Jade Design in June, 2013.
However, in December 2013, Bob Carver and Jade Design parted ways.

Amplifier modeling 
Carver caused a stir in the industry in the mid-1980s when he challenged two high-end audio magazines to give him any audio amplifier at any price, and he’d duplicate its sound in one of his lower cost (and usually much more powerful) designs.  Two magazines accepted the challenge.

First, The Audio Critic chose a Mark Levinson ML-2 which Bob acoustically copied (transfer function duplication) and sold as his M1.5t amplifier (the “t” stood for transfer function modified).

In 1985, Stereophile magazine challenged Bob to copy a Conrad-Johnson Premier Four (the make and model was not named then, but revealed later) amplifier at their offices in New Mexico within 48 hours. The Conrad Johnson amplifiers were one of the most highly regarded amplifiers of the day, costing in excess of $6,000 a pair.

In both cases, the challenging amplifier could only be treated as a “black box” and could not even have its lid removed.  Nevertheless, Carver, used null difference testing, (null difference testing consists of driving two different amplifiers with identical signal sources and exact levels, but out of phase by exactly 180 degrees. If the amplifiers were 100% identical, no sound would be heard. If sound was heard, the audio amps had different properties).  Bob Carver used "distortion pots" to introduce amplifier characteristics, fine-tuned to null-out any sound differences. His modified amplifier sound was so similar, Stereophile Magazine editors could not tell the difference between his amplifier and one costing more than $6,000.  This amplifier was marketed as the M1.0t for about $400.00. Carver successfully copied the sound of the target amplifier and won the challenge. The Stereophile employees failed to tell the difference in their own listening room.  He marketed “t” versions of his amplifiers incorporating the sound of the Mark Levinson and Conrad Johnson designs which caused him some criticism.  In light of this criticism, Carver went on to design the Silver Seven, the most expensive and esoteric conventional amplifier up to that time and duplicated its sound in his M 4.0t and later models which sold for some 1/40th the price (around $600–$1500).

This also started Carver's departure from the M-series amplifier to the more robust and current-pushing TFM series amplifiers.  The TFM amplifiers were designed specifically to drive the demanding load of the Amazing ribbon loudspeakers.  The apex of Carver's amplifier line was the Lightstar, which is now a collectors' item.  Only approximately 100 of the amplifiers were made.  The original Lightstar amplifier, called the Lightstar Reference, featured a dual-monoblock design, with separate power cords for each channel.  A later version, called the Lightstar 2.0, featured one power cord & other cost-saving measures to shave approximately $1800 off the retail price.  The two are reported to be sonically identical.

Carver also later sued Stereophile magazine for its alleged bias against Carver products. (Stereophile had first filed suit against Carver for reprinting the magazine's copyrighted material without authorization.) The case was arbitrated with neither side awarded damages.

Product naming
Carver has used some names in marketing which have other technical definitions:

The Phase Linear 1000 audio processor, and the Model 4000 preamplifier, which incorporate the same circuitry, have noise reduction in four frequency bands, one in the bass intended to suppress turntable rumble and three in the treble intended to suppress tape hiss and such. The noise filters are controlled by signals derived from bandpass filters, not from a correlation process. Correlation is the comparison of two or more signals, while auto-correlation is the comparison of a signal with delayed versions of itself to determine the degree of similarity at different delay times — useful, for example, to determine the amount of delay that produced an echo. 
"Magnetic field coil power amplifier" — audio amplifiers of the vacuum-tube era used transformers, incorporating coils of wire, to convert the high-voltage, low-current output of the output tubes to a low-voltage, high-current output suitable for loudspeakers. Output transformers are no longer necessary with amplifiers, including Carver's, that use transistors. Carver's , first applied in his model M400 power amplifier, describes a power supply whose input switches on and off at an ultrasonic rate to adapt to the varying power demand of the amplifier. The innovation is in the power supply, not the amplification circuitry, and in the use of switching, not in the use of a coil or coils.
It enhances stereo imaging by introducing a delayed and equalized signal from the right channel at the left loudspeaker to cancel the signal from the right loudspeaker at the listener's left ear (and vice versa).
This innovation was introduced in the Carver TX-1-11 component FM stereo tuner noise reduction unit and the Carver TX-11 AM/FM Stereo Tuner in 1982.
Sunfire Corporation:

The creation of the perfect solid-state amplifier:

1) Full output current from each transistor is always available up to 20 amperes per transistor.

2) Massive output current is available even at low output impedances.

3) Heat sinks are not required.

4) Power continuously doubles down to below 1 ohm.

5) Most of the input power goes to the load, therefore, the power supply can weigh 30 pounds instead of 80 pounds. The amplifier can supply humongous current, massive output power, tremendous voltage, runs cool, and is efficient.

6) Only 12 output transistors are needed per channel for a peak-to-peak current of 240 amps.

7) Bias current and idling current issues become irrelevant and nonproblematic.

8) The Tracking Downconverter multiplies current in the same ratio that the output voltage is reduced and it does so automatically by its intrinsic nature.

9) At high impedances, it delivers high voltage and high current. At low impedances or difficult impedances, it delivers even more current, delivering awesome and difficult to believe amounts.

10) When biwired, Sunfire delivers incredible bass whack and a huge three dimensional sound stage with detail retrieval so stunning that you will often hear musicians breathing.

Pictures

References
The information on Carver products comes from Carver product brochures and manuals.  Carver's career has been extensively covered by audio industry magazines including Stereophile, Audio, High Fidelity, and Stereo Review.

External links
Sunfire
Bob Carver LLC

Patents

 Amplifier with Protective Energy Limiter Circuit Components, filed January 1972, issued April 1973
 Method and Apparatus for Reducing Noise Content in Audio Signals, filed October 1974, issued November 1976 (auto-correlator noise reduction)
 Dimensional Sound Producing Apparatus and Method, filed April 1979, issued August 1980 (sonic holography)
 Audio Amplifier and Method of Operating Same, filed November 1978, issued August 1980 (magnetic field coil power amplifier)
 Dimensional Sound Recording and Apparatus and Method for Producing the Same, filed April 1979, issued January 1982
 Tuning Apparatus and Method, filed May 1981, issued November 1983
 Audio Amplifier, filed February 1982, issued April 1984 
 FM Stereo Apparatus and Method, filed June 1982, issued June 1984 (asymmetrical charge coupled stereo detector)
  High Efficiency, Light Weight Audio Amplifier and Power Supply, filed September 1982, issued November 1984
  Audio Amplifying Apparatus and Method, filed June 1984, issued April 1986
 Lightweight, High Power Audio Amplifier and Power Supply, filed December 1986, issued February 1989
 Apparatus and Methods for Removing Unwanted Components from a Communications Signal, filed December 1986, issued March 1989
 High Power Audio Subwoofer, filed January 1996, issued May 1998
 High Back EMF, High Pressure Subwoofer, filed August 1997, issued August 1999
 Integrated Audio Amplifier, filed September 1998, issued December 2000

American audio engineers
Living people
Year of birth missing (living people)
Place of birth missing (living people)